Lewis Burr Sturges (March 15, 1763 – March 30, 1844) was a member of the U.S. House of Representatives from Connecticut from 1805 to 1817. He was born in Fairfield, Conn., the son of Jonathan Sturges, who also served in the House.

Sturges graduated from Yale College in 1782, engaged in mercantile pursuits in New Haven, and returned to Fairfield, Conn., in 1786. He served as clerk of the probate court for the district of Fairfield from 1787 to 1791, and was a member of the State house of representatives from 1794 to 1803. Sturges was elected as a Federalist to the Ninth Congress to fill in part the vacancies caused by the resignations of Calvin Goddard and Roger Griswold. He was reelected to the Tenth and to the four succeeding Congresses and served from September 16, 1805, to March 3, 1817. He later moved to Norwalk, Ohio, where he died in 1844. He is buried in St. Paul’s Episcopal Churchyard there.

External links

Yale College alumni
1763 births
1844 deaths
People from Fairfield, Connecticut
Members of the Connecticut House of Representatives
Federalist Party members of the United States House of Representatives from Connecticut
Lewis